Rudolph the Red-Nosed Reindeer is a 1964 Christmas stop motion animated television special produced by Videocraft International, Ltd. (later known as Rankin/Bass Productions) and currently distributed by NBCUniversal Television Distribution (later known as NBCUniversal Syndication Studios).  It first aired December 6, 1964, on the NBC television network in the United States and was sponsored by General Electric under the umbrella title of The General Electric Fantasy Hour. The special was based on the 1949 Johnny Marks song "Rudolph the Red-Nosed Reindeer" which was itself based on the poem of the same name written in 1939 by Marks' brother-in-law, Robert L. May. Since 1972, the special has aired on CBS; the network unveiled a high-definition, digitally remastered version of the program in 2005, re-scanned frame-by-frame from the original 35 mm film elements.

As with A Charlie Brown Christmas and How the Grinch Stole Christmas, Rudolph no longer airs just once annually but several times during the Christmas and holiday season. It has been telecast every year since 1964, making it the longest continuously running Christmas TV special in the United States. The 50th anniversary of the television special was marked in 2014, and a series of postage stamps featuring Rudolph was issued by the United States Postal Service on November 6, 2014. A special exhibit was also mounted at the Masterworks Museum in Bermuda where the original puppets are held.

In 2019, Freeform (formerly ABC Family) started airing the special as part of its 25 Days of Christmas/Rankin-Bass Christmas holiday programming block.

Plot 

Donner, Santa's lead reindeer, and his wife have a new fawn named Rudolph. They are surprised to find out he was born with a glowing red nose. Donner attempts to first cover Rudolph's nose with mud, and later uses a fake nose, so Rudolph will fit in with the other reindeer. The following spring, Rudolph goes out for the reindeer games, where the new fawns learn to fly and are scouted by Santa for future sleigh duty. Rudolph meets a doe named Clarice, who tells him he is cute, making Rudolph fly. While he celebrates with the other bucks, Rudolph's fake nose pops off, causing the other reindeer to mock him and Coach Comet to expel him.

Rudolph meets and joins Hermey, a misfit elf who left Santa's workshop because he wants to be a dentist, and Yukon Cornelius, a prospector who has spent his life searching for silver and gold. After escaping the Abominable Snow Monster, all three land on the Island of Misfit Toys. It is a place where unloved or unwanted toys reside with their ruler, a winged lion named King Moonracer, who brings the toys to the island until he can find homes and children who will love them. The king allows them to stay one night on the island and asks them to ask Santa to find homes for them. Rudolph leaves on his own, worried that his nose will endanger his friends.

Time passes and Rudolph, now a young stag, returns home to find that his parents and Clarice have been searching for him. He then travels to the Abominable's cave, where they are being held captive. Rudolph attempts to rescue Clarice until the monster knocks him down with a stalactite. Hermey and Yukon eventually show up with a plan to help out Rudolph. Hermey lures the monster out of the cave by imitating the sound of a pig and pulls out the Abominable's teeth after Yukon knocks him out. Yukon drives the toothless monster back over a cliff and falls with it.

Rudolph, Hermey, Clarice, and the Donners return home where everyone apologizes to them. Yukon returns with a tamed Abominable, now trained to trim a Christmas tree, explaining that the monster's bouncing ability saved both of their lives. Christmas Eve comes and while everybody is celebrating, Santa announces that a big snowstorm is approaching, forcing him to cancel Christmas. Blinded by Rudolph's bright nose, he changes his mind and asks Rudolph to lead the sleigh. Rudolph accepts, and their first stop is the Island of Misfit Toys, where Santa delivers the toys to children.

Cast

 Burl Ives as Sam the Snowman
 Billie Mae Richards as Rudolph
 Paul Soles as Hermey
 Larry Mann as Yukon Cornelius and Bumble
 Stan Francis as Santa Claus and King Moonracer
 Alfie Scopp as Fireball, Charlie-in-the-Box, and various male elves
 Janis Orenstein as Clarice
 Paul Kligman as Donner and Coach Comet
 Carl Banas as Head Elf and various Misfit Toys
 Corinne Conley as Mrs. Donner and Dolly for Sue
 Peg Dixon as Mama Claus
 Bernard Cowan as Clarice's father and the Misfit Elephant (uncredited)

Production
The special, with the teleplay by Romeo Muller, introduced several new characters inspired by the song's lyrics. Muller told an interviewer shortly before his death that he would have preferred to base the teleplay on May's original book, but could not find a copy. Other than Burl Ives, all characters were portrayed by Canadian actors recorded at RCA studios in Toronto under the supervision of Bernard Cowan.

Rankin and Bass chose Canadian voice actors for two reasons. First, while the last radio dramas in the U.S. had ended production a few years previously, many were still being produced in Canada, giving the producers a large talent pool to choose from. Second, Rankin and Bass, financially stretched while making Tales of the Wizard of Oz a few years earlier, had been able to complete that series only due to the lower labor costs in Canada.

Ives' parts were recorded later. He and his character were added to the cast just before the end of production, after NBC and General Electric, the show's sponsor, asked Rankin and Bass to add a name familiar to audiences to the cast. Character designer Antony Peters intentionally made the Sam the Snowman character resemble Ives.

After the script, concept designs and storyboards for Rudolph were done by Arthur Rankin, Jr. and his staff of artists at Rankin/Bass in New York City. The company's trademark stop motion animation process, known as "Animagic", was  filmed at MOM Productions in Tokyo with supervision by Tadahito Mochinaga and associate direction by Kizo Nagashima. Besides Rudolph, Mochinaga and the rest of the Japanese puppet animation staff are also known for their partnership with Rankin/Bass on their other Animagic productions almost throughout the 1960s, from The New Adventures of Pinocchio, to Willy McBean and his Magic Machine, to The Daydreamer and Mad Monster Party?

In the original production Billie Mae Richards, who voiced Rudolph, was credited as "Billy Richards" since Rankin and Bass did not want to disclose that a woman had done the part. Antony Peters' name was also misspelled, as was the year of the copyright notice (which used Roman numerals), listing it as MCLXIV (year 1164) and not MCMLXIV, potentially weakening the copyright.

The dolls for Rudolph and Santa cost $5,000 to make.

Aftermath
Since those involved with the production had no idea of the future value of the stop-motion puppet figures used in the production, many were not preserved. Rankin claimed in 2007 to be in possession of an original Rudolph figure. Nine other puppets—including Santa and young Rudolph—were given to a secretary, who gave them to family members, which were eventually damaged over time due to poor storage. In 2005, the remaining two puppets of Rudolph and Santa were appraised on Antiques Roadshow; the episode aired in 2006 on PBS. At that time, their appraised value was between $8,000 and $10,000. The puppets had been damaged through years of rough handling by children and storage in an attic. Toy aficionado Kevin Kriess bought Santa and Rudolph in 2005; in 2007, he had both puppets restored by Screen Novelties, a Los Angeles-based collective of film directors specializing in stop-motion animation, with puppet fabricator Robin Walsh leading the project. The figures have been shown at conventions since then. They were sold at auction on November 13, 2020. netting a $368,000 sale price, doubling the expected return. On December 22, 2020, they were donated to the Center for Puppetry Arts in Atlanta, Georgia.

Ives, and his estate since his 1995 death, received annual residuals from the show, the only actor in it to do so. "This business of residuals was new to our union, which was not quite as strong as SAG or others in the States", Soles recalled in 2014. He, Richards and the other main cast voices received only a thousand dollars over the three years after the special's original airing; it has in some years since made $100 million. While Richards said in 2000 that her compensation was a "sore subject" for her, she had no complaints about the work itself. "I feel so lucky to have something that has made such an impact on people, and it's because of the story first and foremost."

Songs 
 "Jingle, Jingle, Jingle" - Santa Claus
 "We Are Santa's Elves" - Elves
 "There's Always Tomorrow" - Clarice
 "We're a Couple of Misfits" - Rudolph and Hermey
 "Silver and Gold" - Sam the Snowman
 "The Most Wonderful Day of the Year" - Misfit Toys
 "A Holly Jolly Christmas" - Sam the Snowman
 "Rudolph the Red-Nosed Reindeer" - Sam the Snowman

Versions

Original 1964 NBC broadcast edit 
This version has the NBC "living color" peacock at the introduction. It includes the original end credits, where an elf drops presents that list all the technical credits. It also includes commercials that were exclusively for GE small appliances with some of the same animated elves from the main program introducing each of the products, and closing NBC network bumpers, including promos for the following week's episodes of GE College Bowl and Meet the Press, which were presumably pre-empted that Sunday for the inaugural 5:30 p.m. (EST) telecast. The College Bowl quiz show was also sponsored by GE. The original does not include Santa traveling to the Island of Misfit Toys, but does include a scene near the end of the special in which Yukon Cornelius discovers a peppermint mine near Santa's workshop. He can be seen throughout the special tossing his pickax into the air, sniffing, then licking the end that contacts the snow or ice. Deletion of the peppermint segment in 1965, to make room for Santa traveling to the Island of Misfit Toys, leaves the audience to assume that Cornelius was attempting to find either silver or gold by taste alone.

1965–1997 telecasts 
The 1965 broadcast also included a new duet between Rudolph and Hermey called "Fame and Fortune", which replaced a scene in which the same characters sang "We're a Couple of Misfits". Viewers of the 1964 special complained that Santa was not shown fulfilling his promise to the Misfit Toys (to include them in his annual toy delivery). In reaction, a new scene for subsequent rebroadcasts was produced with Santa making his first stop at the Island to pick up the toys. This is the ending that has been shown on all telecasts and video releases ever since. Until sometime in the 1970s, the special aired without additional cuts, but eventually more commercial time was required by the network. In 1978, several sequences were deleted to make room for more advertising: the instrumental bridge from "We Are Santa's Elves" featuring the elf orchestra, additional dialogue by Burl Ives, and the "Peppermint Mine" scene resolving the fate of Yukon Cornelius. The special's 1993 restoration saw "Misfits" returned to its original film context, and the 2004 DVD release showcases "Fame and Fortune" as a separate musical number.

1998–2004 CBS telecasts 
Most of the 1965 deletions were restored in 1998, and "Fame and Fortune" was replaced with the original "We're a Couple of Misfits" reprise. A short slide reading "Rankin/Bass Presents" was inserted at the beginning of the special to reflect the company's name change.

Post-2005 telecasts 
Starting in 2005, CBS re-inserted the "Fame and Fortune" scene, albeit with the soundtrack replaced by a rather hastily edited version of "We're a Couple of Misfits". The special has also been edited to make more time for commercial advertising.

2019–present Freeform broadcast edit 
In May 2019, it was announced that Freeform would air the special as part of their annual 25 Days of Christmas line-up for the first time, alongside Frosty the Snowman. The agreement was later revealed not to be an exclusive rights agreement, as CBS retained their broadcast rights to air the special twice under a separate license with Classic Media/Universal. CBS still shows the version they have had since 2005, while Freeform's airings reinsert much of the material deleted or changed from CBS's broadcasts, such as the original version of "We're a Couple of Misfits" as well as the "Peppermint Mine" scene, making it the first time that the latter scene has been seen on television since the original broadcast. Freeform's print of the special also has the 2012 Universal Pictures logo preceding the special, due to their purchase of Classic Media's owner, DreamWorks Animation in 2016.

Dolly for Sue mystery 

Dolly for Sue, a supporting character from the special, has sparked speculation since her debut. Being a seemingly normal-looking rag doll, fans and critics pondered over the truth behind Dolly's reasoning for being on the Island of Misfit Toys for nearly fifty years. For some time, it was debated that it had to do with her physical appearance, particularly her missing a nose.

Other speculations were raised, and many believed Dolly was only created because the rest of the toys on the island were “boys,” so they created a “girl” toy to balance the cast.

In the early 2000s, during an interview with Television Academy, Arthur Rankin Jr. revealed that the reason she stands out from all the other misfit toys is because she was a last-minute addition to the cast, and hinted at the possibly of it being due to psychological reasons.

On December 8, 2007, during a trivia game on Wait Wait... Don't Tell Me!, the mystery was seemingly put to rest as Rankin himself admitted in a recent interview: "she was cast off by her mistress and was clinically depressed." The reasoning behind her being on the island was due to being abandoned by her owner, causing her to feel abandoned with a backstory similar to characters in Pixar’s Toy Story.

Home media 
When Rudolph the Red-Nosed Reindeer was first released on VHS and LaserDisc by Family Home Entertainment under license from Broadway Video from 1989 to 1996 under the Christmas Classics Series label, the 1965 rebroadcast print described above was used. It got re-released in 1997 by Family Home Entertainment under license from Golden Books Family Entertainment. It used the same print, but with the GBFE logo at the end instead of the Broadway Video logo. All current video prints of Rudolph by Classic Media are a compendium of the two previous telecast versions of the special. All the footage in the current versions follow the original 1964 NBC broadcast (without the original GE commercials) up until the "Peppermint Mine" scene, followed by the final act of the 1965 edit (with the Island of Misfit Toys finale and the 1965 alternate credits in place of the original end credit sequence).

In 1998, the special was re-released on VHS by Sony Wonder under license from Golden Books Family Entertainment. In 1999, the special was released for the first time on DVD by the two companies. In 2010, the special was released for the first time on Blu-ray by Vivendi Entertainment. This edit has been made available in original color form by former rights holders Classic Media, (which in 2012 became the DreamWorks Classics division of DreamWorks Animation, and finally in 2016, part of Universal Pictures) As previously mentioned, this is also the version that had previously aired on CBS, albeit in edited form to accommodate more commercial time. On November 4, 2014, they re-released the special on a 50th anniversary edition on Blu-ray and DVD. The same 50th anniversary Blu-ray edition was released with an exclusive storybook; this was only sold at Walmart. Universal Pictures Home Entertainment re-released the special again on DVD and Blu-ray in 2018.

Soundtrack 

The songs were written by Johnny Marks, with musical director Maury Laws composing the incidental score. In addition to songs written specifically for the film, several of Marks' other holiday standards populate the instrumental score, among them "Rockin' Around the Christmas Tree" and "I Heard the Bells on Christmas Day". Many of the songs are utilized in the score as musical themes for recurring characters and ideas, such as "Silver and Gold" (for Yukon Cornelius, sung by Burl Ives), "Jingle, Jingle, Jingle" (Santa, sung by Stan Francis) and "There's Always Tomorrow" (Clarice, sung by Janis Orenstein). Some of these themes are modified for dramatic purposes, particularly those of the Abominable Snow Monster, who has several interwoven themes; a primary motif, indicated by brass and an F minor key; a modulating chase theme led by tack piano; a tritonal attack theme combining the latter two; and finally the deleted song "The Abominable Snow Monster", which is alluded to melodically during a scene in the Abominable's cave. None of the film's original score has ever been released.

In 1964, an LP record of the soundtrack was released on Decca Records. It contained different mixes of the original songs performed as they are in the special, with the exception of Burl Ives' material, which has been re-recorded. MCA Special Products released the soundtrack on CD in June 1995. It is an exact duplication of the original LP released in 1964. Tracks 1-9 are the remixed soundtrack selections while tracks 10-19 are the same songs performed by the Decca Concert Orchestra. The song "Fame and Fortune" is not contained on either release. On November 30, 2004, the soundtrack was certified Gold by the Recording Industry Association of America for selling over 500,000 copies.

Ives re-recorded "A Holly Jolly Christmas", with different arrangements, for the song's 1964 single release. This version, along with a similarly newly recorded version of "Rudolph the Red-Nosed Reindeer", was released the following year on his 1965 album Have a Holly Jolly Christmas.

Merchandise 
Books and other items related to the show have in some cases misspelled "Hermey" as "Herbie". Rick Goldschmidt, who wrote Rudolph the Red-Nosed Reindeer: The Making of the Rankin/Bass Holiday Classic, says the scripts by Romeo Muller show the spelling to be "Hermey".

A Rudolph the Red-Nosed Reindeer video game was released on November 9, 2010. The adaptation was published by Red Wagon Games for the Wii and Nintendo DS, and was developed by High Voltage Software and Glyphic Entertainment respectively. The Wii version was received poorly, and garnered extremely negative reviews from sites such as IGN giving it a 1.5/10.

Reception 
Rudolph the Red-Nosed Reindeer received an approval rating of 95% on review aggregator website Rotten Tomatoes, based on thirteen reviews, with an average rating of 9.37/10. The site's critical consensus reads: "Rudolph the Red-Nosed Reindeer is a yule-tide gem that bursts with eye-popping iconography, a spirited soundtrack, and a heart-warming celebration of difference." In December 2018, a Hollywood Reporter/Morning Consult poll which surveyed 2,200 adults from Nov. 15–18, 2018, named Rudolph the Red-Nosed Reindeer the most beloved holiday film, with 83 percent of respondents having a generally favorable response to the title.

Sequels 
The Rankin/Bass special inspired numerous television sequels made by the same studio:
 Rudolph's Shiny New Year (1976), a special that first aired on ABC and is still aired annually on both ABC and Freeform.
 Rudolph and Frosty's Christmas in July (1979), a feature-length special that paired Rudolph with the song-inspired character Frosty the Snowman.
 Rudolph the Red-Nosed Reindeer and the Island of Misfit Toys (2001), a direct-to-video computer-animated film. Released by a team that produced an unrelated Rudolph movie in 1998, neither Rankin/Bass or its descendant companies had any involvement in its production.
 Rudolph the Red-Nosed Reindeer - 4D Attraction  (2016), 10-minute stop motion story adaptation in the form of a 4D film for SimEx-Iwerks; produced by Bent Image Lab and directed by Chel White.
 T.E.A.M. Rudolph and the Reindeer Games (2018), a short film adaptation of the book of the same name was featured on the original film's 2018 Blu-ray release.

In popular culture 
The television special's familiarity to American audiences through its annual rebroadcasts, along with its stop-motion animation that is easy to recreate with modern technology and the special's ambiguous copyright status, has lent itself to numerous parodies and homages over the years.

Films by Corky Quakenbush 
Animator Corky Quakenbush has produced parodies of Rudolph for several American television shows:
 In its December 16, 1995 episode, the Fox Network's comedy series MADtv aired "Raging Rudolph", which also parodied Martin Scorsese's films. In it, Sam The Snowman narrates in a Joe Pesci-like voice how Rudolph and Hermey got violent Mafia-style revenge on their tormentors. This was followed by two sequels: "The Reinfather", spoofing The Godfather trilogy and "A Pack of Gifts Now", spoofing Apocalypse Now.
 A 2001 episode of That '70s Show, titled "An Eric Forman Christmas", featured a subplot where Kelso was taunted by his friends for still watching "kiddie shows" like Rudolph even though he was in high school. A dream sequence produced and directed by Quakenbush, Kelso himself appears in stop-motion form with Rudolph and Santa who encourage him to continue watching their show.
 In December 2005, the George Lopez Show featured an animated segment in which Lopez sees a stop-motion version of himself on television in a Rudolph-style special mirroring the theme of the holiday episode.
 In the stop-motion animated film The Nightmare Before Christmas (1993), Jack looks through a book version of Rudolph the Red Nosed Reindeer to find a logical answer to explain Christmas to the other citizens of Halloween Town. Later, Zero, the ghost dog, has a magnificently glowing pumpkin nose, which is bright enough to break through the fog that Sally has conjured up. Jack lets Zero go to the head of his skeleton reindeer team and light the way for him.
 Chel White, of Bent Image Lab, directed two parodies that played on Saturday Night Live''', on Robert Smigel's TV Funhouse:
 In a 2001 TV Funhouse episode, Sam the Snowman refuses to narrate the story because of the September 11, 2001 attacks (even finding the fear of Bumble to be trivial in comparison to America fighting a war in Afghanistan). He then takes two children to Ground Zero at New York City, but Santa Claus convinces him to narrate the story, because people need comforting stories like Rudolph the Red-Nosed Reindeer. Sam decided to narrate the tale, but was immediately interrupted by a special news report. The sketch ends with a silently-furious Sam smashing his banjo over his head.
 In 2004, TV Funhouse referenced the Red state-blue state divide. In the segment, Santa hangs out with liberal celebrities Natalie Merchant, Margaret Cho, Al Franken, and Moby while skipping over the Red states ("screw the red states, voting for that dumbass president just because of that moral values crap. I don't want any part of them!"). Rudolph's red nose turns blue.
 In 2004, for Rudolph the Red-Nosed Reindeer's 40th anniversary, CBS produced stop motion promos for their programming line-up, done in the style of Rankin/Bass animation. Appearing as elves in the CBS promos were puppet versions of CBS stars Jeff Probst from Survivor, Ray Romano and Doris Roberts from Everybody Loves Raymond, William Petersen and Marg Helgenberger from CSI, Charlie Sheen from Two and a Half Men, Phil Simms and Greg Gumbel from The NFL on CBS, and late-night talk show host David Letterman. A new stop-motion animation featuring Rudolph and Santa meeting even more CBS network stars was also aired in 2005.
 Mystery Science Theater 3000 made numerous references to the special in their movie hecklings, such as Rudolph's line "I'm cute!! I'm cuute!! She said I'm cuuuuuutte!!!!". In episode 321, which screened Santa Claus Conquers the Martians, the MST3K cast had their own ideas for potential residents on the Island of Misfit Toys including Toaster Dolls, Patrick Swayze's Roadhouse board game, the EZ Bake Foundry, and Mr. Mashed Potato Head.

 Uses in advertising 
 In 1964, Rankin & Bass produced several commercials for the General Electric-sponsored broadcast.
 In November 2007, the Aflac insurance company released a commercial that featured Rudolph, who has a cold but does not want to miss work. All his friends say he will be unable to pay for his expenses. Santa then tells them about Aflac. Charlie wonders what will happen if Rudolph is not better by Christmas, but Rudolph thinks the Aflac duck can do the work. Rudolph gets better in a week, but Blitzen is sick, so the Aflac duck fills in for him.
 In 2009, Verizon began showing a commercial of the Misfit Toys with an AT&T phone. The characters wonder why it is there with all of its features but soon discover why, when the phone shows a map of where it has 3G coverage. (Verizon's ad campaign touts its much wider 3G coverage compared to AT&T's.) The toy airplane replies: "You're gonna fit right in here!" and falls on the ground laughing.
 Starting in 2011, there have been several Bing.com commercials, filmed to look like the same stop-motion style as the special, which feature several characters including Rudolph, Yukon Cornelius, Hermey, the Bumble, and the Misfit Toys.
 A 2012 commercial for Windows phone features Bumble the Abominable Snowman (with his full set of teeth), speed-dating and getting advice from friends through Live Tiles. A follow-up features Bumble at Santa's North Pole pool party, and Santa using Live Tiles on his new Windows Phone to help him give his elves the holiday-season toy production directives.
 A 2013 commercial for Nissan shows a woman in a dealership briefly entering a fantasy, wherein Santa's Elves, including Boss Elf and Hermey, have expanded their manufacturing line to include Nissan cars.  Furthermore, the Bumble makes an appearance test driving one to his obvious approval.
 CBS celebrated the special's 50th anniversary in 2014 with Rudolph and Sam the Snowman celebrating with cast members from The Big Bang Theory and NCIS while passing by their studio lots.
 In 2014, the United States Postal Service used four characters (Rudolph, Hermey, Yukon Cornelius, and Bumble) for the year's "Contemporary Christmas" stamp issue.
 In 2015, the Rudolph characters began appearing in commercials for AT&T with a stop-motion version of spokes-character Lily Adams.

 Other references 
 The 2003 live-action Will Ferrell comedy Elf pays homage to the Rudolph special with similar stop-motion animation characters interacting with live actors, with Leon (Leon Redbone) appearing in place of Sam the Snowman. The elves also wear the same distinctive red, blue, and green costume design with cone-shaped hats. 
 In 2010, the comedy website CollegeHumor made a short parody video called "Rudolph The Regular Reindeer", depicting what the special would've been like if Rudolph's nose had been surgically fixed as an infant.
 In the sci-fi/comedy series The Orville, during the 2017 episode "About a Girl", the character of Bortus is shown Rudolph by other crew members to make him reconsider his plans to arrange gender reassignment surgery for his newborn daughter. (Bortus's species, the Moclans, are a single-gender species who statistically produce only one female every seventy-five years, with females having no place in their society) Rudolph'' demonstrates to Bortus how unconventional people can accomplish great things, although Bortus humorously misinterprets part of the film's story as suggesting that Rudolph's father may have considered euthanizing his child as an anomaly.

See also 
 
 List of animated feature films
 List of Christmas television specials
 List of stop-motion films
 Rudolph the Red-Nosed Reindeer (video game)
 List of Rankin/Bass Productions films

Explanatory notes

References

External links 

 
 
 Character Arts' official licensee site for Rudolph the Red-Nosed Reindeer licensing 

1964 animated films
1964 in American television
1964 television specials
1960s American television specials
American annual television specials
1960s animated television specials
Musical television specials
Films about bullying
CBS television specials
Christmas television specials
Films about elves
Films scored by Johnny Marks
General Electric sponsorships
NBC television specials
Rankin/Bass Productions television specials
Stop-motion animated television shows
Rudolph the Red-Nosed Reindeer
Santa Claus in film
Santa Claus in television
Sentient toys in fiction
Stop-motion animated short films
Television shows written by Romeo Muller
American Christmas television specials
Animated Christmas television specials
1960s American films